Dan Lusthaus is an American writer on Buddhism. He is a graduate of Temple University's Department of Religion, and is a specialist in Yogācāra. The author of several articles and books on the topic, Lusthaus has taught at UCLA, Florida State University, the University of Missouri, and in the Autumn of 2020 he was an Associate in the Department of South Asian Studies at Harvard University.

Lusthaus also collaborated with Heng-ching Shih in the translation of Kuiji's (K'uei-chi) commentary on the Heart Sutra with the Numata translation project. Lusthaus is an editor for the Digital Dictionary of Buddhism, in the area of Indian/East Asian Yogācāra/Tathāgatagarbha. He contributed the contents of his catalogue of the major Yogācāra translations of Xuanzang to the DDB, as well as a number of other terms related to the Cheng Weishi Lun and Yogācārabhūmi-śāstra.

Publications

References 
 Members database at Daoist Studies.org
 Web article listing alumni of various universities' Religion programs.

American Buddhists
American non-fiction writers
Temple University alumni
Year of birth missing (living people)
Living people
Buddhist writers
University of Missouri faculty